Henriette the Forsaken is an 1832 play by the British writer John Baldwin Buckstone. It premiered at the Adelphi Theatre in London's West End. Melodrama was in fashion at the time, and the play was a popular hit.

The original cast included Frederick Henry Yates as Ferdinand De Monval, John Reeve as Chevalier Pirouette, John Baldwin Buckstone as Pierre Gigot, Elizabeth Yates as Henriette and Fanny Fitzwilliam as Rose.

References

Bibliography
 Gressman, Malcolm George. The Career of John Baldwin Buckstone. Ohio State University, 1963.
 Nicoll, Allardyce. A History of Early Nineteenth Century Drama 1800-1850. Cambridge University Press, 1930.

1832 plays
West End plays
Plays by John Baldwin Buckstone